A fan coil unit (FCU), also known as a Vertical Fan Coil-Unit (VFC), is a device consisting of a heat exchanger (coil) and a fan. FCUs are commonly found in HVAC systems of residential, commercial, and industrial buildings that use ducted split air conditioning or with central plant cooling. FCUs are typically connected to ductwork and a thermostat to regulate the temperature of one or more spaces and to assist the main air handling unit for each space if used with chillers. The thermostat controls the fan speed and/or the flow of water or refrigerant to the heat exchanger using a control valve.

Due to their simplicity, flexibility and easy maintenance, fan coil units can be more economical to install than ducted 100% fresh air systems (VAV) or central heating systems with air handling units or chilled beams. FCUs come in various configurations, including horizontal (ceiling-mounted) and vertical (floor-mounted) and can be used in a wide range of applications from small residential units to large commercial and industrial buildings.

Noise output from FCUs, like any other form of air conditioning, depends on the design of the unit and the building materials surrounding it. Some FCUs offer noise levels as low as NR25 or NC25

The output from an FCU can be established by looking at the temperature of the air entering the unit and the temperature of the air leaving the unit, coupled with the volume of air being moved through the unit. This is a simplistic statement, and there is further reading on sensible heat ratios and the specific heat capacity of air, both of which have an effect on thermal performance.

Design and operation
Fan Coil Unit covers a range of products and will mean different things to users, specifiers, and installers in different countries and regions, particularly in relation to product size and output capability.

Fan Coil Unit falls principally into two main types: blow through and draw through. As the names suggest, in the first type the fans are fitted behind the  heat exchanger, and in the other type the fans are fitted in front the coil such that they draw air through it. Draw through units are considered thermally superior, as ordinarily they make better use of the heat exchanger. However they are more expensive, as they require a chassis to hold the fans whereas a blow-through unit typically consists of a set of fans bolted straight to a coil.

A fan coil unit may be concealed or exposed within the room or area that it serves.

An exposed fan coil unit may be wall-mounted, freestanding or ceiling mounted, and will typically include an appropriate enclosure to protect and conceal the fan coil unit itself, with return air grille and supply air diffuser set into that enclosure to distribute the air.

A concealed fan coil unit will typically be installed within an accessible ceiling void or services zone. The return air grille and supply air diffuser, typically set flush into the ceiling, will be ducted to and from the fan coil unit and thus allows a great degree of flexibility for locating the grilles to suit the ceiling layout and/or the partition layout within a space. It is quite common for the return air not to be ducted and to use the ceiling void as a return air plenum.

The coil receives hot or cold water from a central plant, and removes heat from or adds heat to the air through heat transfer. Traditionally fan coil units can contain their own internal thermostat, or can be wired to operate with a remote thermostat. However, and as is common in most modern buildings with a Building Energy Management System (BEMS), the control of the fan coil unit will be by a local digital controller or outstation (along with associated room temperature sensor and control valve actuators) linked to the BEMS via a communication network, and therefore adjustable and controllable from a central point, such as a supervisors head end computer.

Fan coil units circulate hot or cold water through a coil in order to condition a space. The unit gets its hot or cold water from a central plant, or mechanical room containing equipment for removing heat from the central building's closed-loop. The equipment used can consist of machines used to remove heat such as a chiller or a cooling tower and equipment for adding heat to the building's water such as a boiler or a commercial water heater.

Hydronic fan coil units can be generally divided into two types: Two-pipe fan coil units or four-pipe fan coil units. Two-pipe fan coil units have one supply and one return pipe. The supply pipe supplies either cold or hot water to the unit depending on the time of year. Four-pipe fan coil units have two supply pipes and two return pipes. This allows either hot or cold water to enter the unit at any given time. Since it is often necessary to heat and cool different areas of a building at the same time, due to differences in internal heat loss or heat gains, the four-pipe fan coil unit is most commonly used.

Fan coil units may be connected to piping networks using various topology designs, such as "direct return", "reverse return", or "series decoupled".  See ASHRAE Handbook "2008 Systems & Equipment", Chapter 12.

Depending upon the selected chilled water temperatures and the relative humidity of the space, it is likely that the cooling coil will dehumidify the entering air stream, and as a by product of this process, it will at times produce a condensate which will need to be carried to drain. The fan coil unit will contain a purpose designed drip tray with drain connection for this purpose. The simplest means to drain the condensate from multiple fan coil units will be by a network of pipework laid to falls to a suitable point. Alternatively a condensate pump may be employed where space for such gravity pipework is limited.

Speed control of the fan motors within a fan coil unit is partly used to control the heating and cooling output desired from the unit. Some manufacturers accomplish speed control by adjusting the taps on an AC transformer supplying the power to the fan motor. Typically this would require adjustment at the commissioning stage of the building construction process and is therefore set for life at a fixed speed. Other manufacturers provide custom-wound Permanent Split Capacitor (PSC) motors with speed taps in the windings, set to the desired speed levels for the fan coil unit design. A simple speed selector switch (Off-High-Medium-Low) is provided for the local room occupant to control the fan speed. Typically this speed selector switch is integral to the room thermostat, and is set manually or is controlled automatically by the digital room thermostat.  Building Energy Management Systems can be used for automatic fan speed and temperature control. Fan motors are typically AC Shaded Pole or Permanent Split Capacitor.  More recent developments include brushless DC designs with electronic commutation. Compared to units with asynchronous 3-speed motors, the fan coil units with brushless motors will reduce the power consumption up to 70%.

Fan coil units linked to ducted split air conditioning units use refrigerant in the cooling coil instead of chilled coolant and linked to a large condenser unit instead of a chiller. They might also be linked to liquid-cooled condenser units which use an intermediate coolant to cool the condenser using cooling towers.

DC/EC motor powered units
These motors are sometimes called DC motors, sometimes called EC motors and occasionally EC/DC motors. DC stands for Direct Current and EC stands for Electronically Commutated.

DC motors allow the speed of the fans within a Fan Coil Unit to be controlled by means of a 0-10 Volt input 'Signal' to the motor/s, the transformers and speed switches associated with AC Fan Coils are not required. Up to a signal voltage of 2.5 Volts (which may vary with different fan/motor manufacturers) the fan will be in a stopped condition but as the signal voltage is increased, the fan will seamlessly increase in speed until the maximum is reached at a signal Voltage of 10 Volts. Fan Coils will generally operate between approximately 4 Volts and 7.5 Volts because below 4 Volts the air volumes are ineffective and above 7.5 Volts the Fan Coil is likely to be too noisy for most commercial applications.

The 0-10 Volt signal voltage can be set via a simple potentiometer and left or the 0-10 Volt signal voltage can be delivered to the fan motors by the terminal controller on each of the Fan Coil Units. The former is very simple and cheap but the latter opens up the opportunity to continuously alter the fan speed depending on various external conditions/influences. These conditions/criteria could be the 'real time' demand for either heating or cooling, occupancy levels, window switches, time clocks or any number of other inputs from either the unit itself, the Building Management System or both.

The reason that these DC Fan Coil Units are, despite their apparent relative complexity, becoming more popular is their improved energy efficiency levels compared to their AC motor driven counterparts of only a few years ago. A straight swap, AC to DC, will reduce electrical consumption by 50% but applying Demand and Occupancy dependent fan speed control can take the savings to as much as 80%. In areas of the world where there are legally enforceable energy efficiency requirements for Fan Coils (such as the UK), DC Fan Coil Units are rapidly becoming the only choice.

Areas of use

In high-rise buildings, fan coils may be vertically stacked, located one above the other from floor to floor and all interconnected by the same piping loop.

Fan coil units are an excellent delivery mechanism for hydronic chiller boiler systems in large residential and light commercial applications.  In these applications the fan coil units are mounted in bathroom ceilings and can be used to provide unlimited comfort zones - with the ability to turn off unused areas of the structure to save energy.

Installation
In high-rise residential construction, typically each fan coil unit requires a rectangular through-penetration in the concrete slab on top of which it sits. Usually, there are either 2 or 4 pipes made of ABS, steel or copper that go through the floor. The pipes are usually insulated with refrigeration insulation, such as acrylonitrile butadiene/polyvinyl chloride (AB/PVC) flexible foam (Rubatex or Armaflex brands) on all pipes, or at least on the chilled water lines to prevent condensate from forming.

Unit ventilator
A unit ventilator is a fan coil unit that is used mainly in classrooms, hotels, apartments and condominium applications. A unit ventilator can be a wall mounted or ceiling hung cabinet, and is designed to use a fan to blow outside air across a coil, thus conditioning and ventilating the space which it is serving.

European market
The Fan Coil is composed of one quarter of 2-pipe-units and three quarters of 4-pipe-units, and the most sold products are "with casing" (35%), "without casing" (28%), "cassette" (18%) and "ducted" (16%).

The market by region was split in 2010 as follows:

See also

 Thermal insulation
 HVAC
 Construction
 Intumescent
 Firestop

References

Mechanical engineering
Heating, ventilation, and air conditioning
Ventilation fans